Yohe is a surname. Notable people with the surname include:

Andrew Yohe (born 1978), American sledge hockey player
Bill Yohe (1878–1938), American baseball player
Gary Yohe, American economist
May Yohé (1866–1938), American actress
Vicki Yohe (born 1965), American singer